Sandrine Favre (born 5 September 1988) is a French ski mountaineer.

Selected results 
 2010:
 5th, World Championship, relay, together with Laëtitia Roux and Valentine Fabre
 2011:
 2nd, World Championship, relay, together with Laëtitia Roux and Émilie Favre
 10th, World Championship, sprint
 8th, Pierra Menta, together with Émilie Favre

External links 
 Sandrine Favre at skimountaineering.org

References 

1988 births
Living people
French female ski mountaineers
21st-century French women